Zachary is a male given name, a variant of Zechariah – the name of several Biblical characters.

People
Pope Zachary (679–752), Pope of the Catholic Church from 741 to 752
Zachary of Vienne (died 106), bishop of Vienne (France), martyr and Roman Catholic saint
Zachary Abel (born 1980), American actor
Zachary Armstrong (born 1984), American artist
Zachary Aston-Reese (born 1994), American ice hockey player
Zachary Babington (1690–1745), High Sheriff of Staffordshire and barrister
Zak Bagans (born 1977), American television host, author, documentary filmmaker and paranormal investigator
 Zachary James Baker, stage name Zacky Vengeance, rhythm guitarist for American rock band Avenged Sevenfold
Zachary Bayly (military officer) (1841–1916), South African colonial military commander
Zachary Bayly (planter) (1721–1769), planter and politician in Jamaica
Zachary Bell (born 1982), Canadian racing cyclist
Zachary Bennett (born 1980), Canadian actor and musician
Zachary Blount (born 1977), American biologist
Zachary Borovay, multi-media designer
Zachary Boyd (1585–1653), Scottish religious writer
Zachary Braiterman, American philosopher
Zachary Brault-Guillard (born 1998), Canadian soccer player
Zachary Breaux (1960–1997), American jazz guitarist
Zachary Breganski, Canadian soccer player
Zachary Brooke (theologian) (1716–1788), English clergyman and academic
Zachary Brooke (historian) (1883–1946), British medieval historian and writer
Zachary Browne (born 1985), American actor
Zachary Bruenger (born 1990), American stock car racing driver
Zachery Ty Bryan (born 1981), American actor
Zachary Burns (born 1996), American rower
Zachary Cairncross (born 1989), Australian footballer
Zachary Carrettin (born 1972), American musician, conductor, and music educator
Zachary Carter (born 1999), American football player
Zachary Catazaro (born 1989), American ballet dancer
Zachary Adam Chesser (born 1989), American convert to Islam who pleaded guilty to aiding a terrorist organization
Zachary Clay (born 1995), Canadian artistic gymnast
Zachary Cooke-Collis (1754–1834), Irish archdeacon
Zachary Cradock (1633–1695)
Zachary Taylor Davis (1872–1946), American architect
Zachary DeVille (born 1993), Guamanian footballer
Zachary Donohue (born 1991), American ice dancer
Zac Efron (born 1987), American actor and singer
Zachary Fisher (1910–1999), Jewish American philanthropist and real estate developer
  (born 1941), physicist
Zachary Gordon (born 1998), American actor
 Zachary Gray, a member of the Canadian indie rock band The Zolas
Zack Hample (born 1977), Major League baseball collector
Zac Hanson (born 1985), American musician, member of band Hanson
Zachary "Zach" Hyman (born 1992), Canadian NHL ice hockey player
Zachary D. Kaufman (born 1979), professor
Zachary Knighton (born 1978), American actor
Zachary Lansdowne (1888–1925), US Navy officer and early naval aviator
Zachary Lemnios (born 1954), American scientist, inventor and former US government Assistant Secretary of Defense for Research and Engineering
Zachary Levi (born 1980), American actor, director, and singer
Zachary Alakaʻi Lum, Kānaka Maoli musician, composer, and hula dancer
Zachary Macaulay (1768–1838), Scottish abolitionist
 Zachary "Zack", Merrick (born 1988), bassist for All Time Low
Zachary Mudge (1770–1852), British Royal Navy admiral
Zachary Pearce (1690–1774), Anglican bishop and writer
Zachary Quinto (born 1977), American actor and producer
Zachary Smith Reynolds (1911–1932), American amateur aviator and youngest child of R. J. Reynolds, founder of the R. J. Reynolds Tobacco Company
Zachary Rhyner (born 1986), U.S. Air Force Combat Controller and Air Force Cross recipient
Zachary Richard (born 1950), American Cajun singer-songwriter and poet
Zachary Scott (1914–1965), American actor
Zachary Cole Smith (born 1984), singer and frontman of DIIV
Zachary T. Space (born 1961), American lawyer and politician
Zachary Stevens (born 1966), American heavy metal and rock singer
Zachary Taylor (1784–1850), 12th President of the United States and US Army major general
Zachary Taylor (Tennessee politician) (1849–1921), U.S. Representative from Tennessee
Zachary Taylor (baseball) (1850–1917), American first baseman in the National Association for the 1874 Baltimore Canaries
Zachary Test (born 1989), American rugby union player
Zachary Turner (2002–2003), one-year-old murdered by his mother
Zachary "Zack" Weiss (born 1992), American Major League Baseball player
Zachary Wohlman (1988–2021), American boxer
Zachary Wyatt (born 1984), former member of the Missouri House of Representatives and only openly gay American Republican legislator

Characters
 Zachary Hale Comstock, primary antagonist of the video game BioShock Infinite
 Zachary “Zach” Dempsey, a character in the novel and Netflix series 13 Reasons Why
 Zachary "Owl Man" Dowling in the Zom-B novel series
 Zachary Gray in the young adult novels of Madeleine L'Engle
 Zackary Marker, the Cardcaptors name for the Cardcaptor Sakura character Takashi Yamazaki, voiced by Andrew Francis
 Zachary "Zack" Morris in the sitcoms Good Morning, Miss Bliss and the Saved by the Bell series
 Dr. Zachary Smith in the 1960s TV show Lost in Space
 Zachary "Zack" Taylor in the Power Rangers universe
 Zachary Zatara in the DC Comics universe

See also
 Zacharie
 Zachery
 Zechariah (given name)
 Zack (personal name)
 Zak (given name)
 Zackary

English masculine given names
English-language masculine given names